Syed Saim Ali, known professionally as Saim Ali, is an actor, fashion designer, model and television host. 

He was a contestant in the reality show Tamasha.

Early life
Saim Ali was born in Lahore and spend his early life there but later he moved to Karachi and is currently living in Karachi.

His father is a landlord in Sindh.

His mother Farah Gillani was a fashion designer, a field he himself worked in for years before choosing acting.

He studied fashion designing in Dubai because famed photographer Khawar Riaz told him that he didn’t have a bright future as a fashion model, a profession he also exercised for few years.

Career 
Since launching his acting career in 2015, Saim Ali has worked in many dramas and movies.

Saim Ali also hosted morning show of channel Aplus Good Morning Zindagi and did several morning shows and hosted awards events like IPP Awards in London and Oslo.

Filmography

Films

Television

References 

1989 births
Living people
21st-century Pakistani male actors
Pakistani fashion designers
Pakistani male models